Joseph Oesterlé (born 1954) is a French mathematician who, along with David Masser, formulated the abc conjecture which has been called "the most important unsolved problem in diophantine analysis".

He is a member of Bourbaki.

References

External links

The ABC conjecture
Oesterlé on the origin of the abc Conjecture

1954 births
Living people
People from Alsace
École Normale Supérieure alumni
20th-century French mathematicians
University of Paris alumni
Number theorists
Nicolas Bourbaki